Svejda or Švejda is a Czech surname. Notable people with the surname include:

Felicitas Svejda (1920–2016), Austrian-Canadian scientist
Jim Svejda (born 1947), American music commentator and critic

Czech-language surnames